Batia Mishani was an Israeli athlete. Between 1964 and 1968, she competed for Team Israel at the Paralympic Games, winning a total of four gold medals, five silver medals, and three bronze medals before retiring.

References

1997 deaths
Paralympic table tennis players of Israel
Paralympic athletes of Israel
Female table tennis players
Athletes (track and field) at the 1964 Summer Paralympics
Athletes (track and field) at the 1968 Summer Paralympics
Paralympic gold medalists for Israel
Paralympic silver medalists for Israel
Paralympic bronze medalists for Israel
Medalists at the 1964 Summer Paralympics
Medalists at the 1968 Summer Paralympics